In computer vision, the Azriel Rosenfeld Award, or Azriel Rosenfeld Life Time Achievement Award was established at ICCV 2007 in Rio de Janeiro to honor outstanding researchers who are recognized as making significant contributions to the field of Computer Vision over longtime careers. This award is in memory of the computer scientist and mathematician Prof. Azriel Rosenfeld.

Recipients
The first Azriel Rosenfeld Award was presented in 2007 at the ICCV in Rio de Janeiro, Brazil, to Takeo Kanade.

The second Azriel Rosenfeld Award was presented in 2009 at the ICCV in Kyoto Japan, to Berthold K.P. Horn.

The third Azriel Rosenfeld Award was presented in 2011 at the ICCV in Barcelona, Spain, to Thomas Huang.

The fourth Azriel Rosenfeld Award was presented in 2013 at the ICCV in Sydney, Australia, to Jan Koenderink.

The fifth Azriel Rosenfeld Award was presented in 2015 at the ICCV in Santiago, Chile, to Olivier Faugeras.

The sixth Azriel Rosenfeld Award was presented in 2017 at the ICCV in Venice, Italy to Tomaso Poggio.

The seventh Azriel Rosenfeld Award was presented in 2019 at the ICCV in Seoul , Korea to Shimon Ullman.

See also
 List of engineering awards
 List of computer science awards

References

Computer vision research infrastructure
Computer science awards
Electrical and electronic engineering awards
IEEE society and council awards